Football Club Trostianets is a Ukrainian football club from Trostianets. In 2018–2019 the club merged with the disbanded FC Naftovyk Okhtyrka (later reinstated). In June 2021, FC Trostianets was admitted to the Second League.

History 
In 2015 the club was reestablished as part of public organization "Sport Trostianechyny" created in 2015. The idea of creation belongs to the mayor of Trostianets Yuriy Bova. As sponsors for the newly established club, there were Trostianets city council and a local chocolate factory owned by the American brand Mondelez International. During its debut season at the 2015 Sumy Oblast championship second tier the club placed second yielding to Lokomotyv Konotop. Later same year it also competed at an off-season tournament the Sumy Oblast winter championship where it placed 4th among 7 teams.

Before start the 2016 season FC Trostianets played an invitational friendly with a team from the Trostianets twin city Boguchwała tying at 1. For the 2016 season the club fielded two teams one in regional competitions of Sumy Oblast (second tier), another in Okhtyrka Raion. That season Trostianets first team placed 3rd, while second team placed 6th. The 2017 season was even less successful for the club and its first team placed only 4th. Later that year Trostianets also hosted a veteran team "Legends of Ukrainian Football" composed of many retired Ukrainian professional footballer among which were Oleg Salenko, Andriy Vorobey, Svyatoslav Syrota, Anatoliy Bezsmertnyi and many more. In 2017 there was initiated reconstruction of the city stadium during which was repaired the administration building, changing rooms, showering rooms, rooms for referees, fence-line at entrance.

In 2018 there took many changes among which was formation of the Trostianets united territorial community (hromada) and city, establishment of SC Akademiya futbolu at the stadium directed by Bohdan Yesyp, dissolution of FC Naftovyk Okhtyrka and its reserve Naftovyk-2. Because of all those events, it was decided to replace discontinued Naftovyk-2 in the Sumy Oblast top tier with FC Trostianets for the 2018 season. At the same time the club kept its reserve team at the Okhtyrka Raion championship (Trostianets-3) and another at the Sumy Oblast second tier (Trostianets-2). The 2018 season FC Trostianets finished 4th at the Sumy Oblast top tier. The same year, the club also reached the Sumy Oblast cup competition final yielding to LS Group (later FC Sumy). Trostianets-2 placed 5th at the Sumy Oblast second tier and it reached the cup competition semifinals being eliminated by the Trostianets first team.

In 2019 both Trostianets (on the rights of the folded Naftovyk Okhtyrka) and Trostianets-2 competed at the Sumy Oblast top tier with Trostianets-2 placing 2nd, while the first team only 4th. Trostianets-2 also won the Sumy Oblast cup and entered the 2019–20 Ukrainian Football Amateur League which in 2020 it finished on the 4th position in Group 2. Competing at the national amateur competition, in 2020 Trostianets-2 changed its name to Trostianets.

In 2020 Trostianets also became a champion of the Sumy Oblast beating in the gold match the revived FC Naftovyk Okhtyrka.

Honours 
 Sumy Oblast Championship
 Winner (1): 2020
 Runners-up (1): 2019
 Sumy Oblast Cup
 Winner (2): 2019, 2020
 Runners-up (1): 2018

Current squad

Head coaches

See also
FC Naftovyk Okhtyrka

References

External links 
 Official website
 Profile. footballfacts.ru

Association football clubs established in 2015
2015 establishments in Ukraine
Football clubs in Sumy Oblast
Ukrainian Second League clubs
Okhtyrka Raion